Warren Shaw is an American sound editor. He was nominated for an Academy Award in the category Best Sound for the film Greyhound. Shaw also won an Primetime Emmy Award and was nominated for one more in the category Outstanding Sound Editing.

Selected filmography 
 Greyhound (2020; co-nominated with Michael Minkler, Beau Borders and David Wyman)

References

External links 

Living people
Place of birth missing (living people)
Year of birth missing (living people)
American sound editors
Primetime Emmy Award winners